An armrest is a part of a chair, where a person can rest their arms on.

Armrests are built into a large variety of chairs such as automotive chairs, armchairs, sofas, and more. Adjustable armrests are commonly found in ergonomic office chairs.

Armrests should support the forearm, which reduces neck and head pain.

Office chairs

Armrests in office chairs are meant to be adjustable to account for the user's height. This is due to the long hours spent sitting in an office, increasing risks of an ergonomic hazard. Since the introduction of the computer into the workspace, armrests have been more important.

Like office chairs, gaming chairs feature an armrest to support the user's arm during gaming sessions.

Armchair

An armchair is a chair with prominent armrests.

Restraints

Restraint chairs are chairs with restraints, which allow an individual to be restrained, thereby preventing them from leaving the chair. Such chairs often feature an armrest, which is used to restrain the arms.

An electric chair is a form of restraint chair used in capital punishment.

In automobiles

In an automotive context, an armrest is a feature found in many modern vehicles on which occupants can rest their arms. Armrests are also found on chairs in general. The term armrest started out as an open compound, but over time became a closed compound word, making the spelling "arm rest" incorrect.

Armrests are more prolific in larger, more expensive models of cars.

Front
In the front of the car, a central armrest, which commonly folds away based on user preference, will also often include a storage compartment and sometimes even cup holders. Some also provide the location for controls for non-essential functions of the vehicle, such as climate control or window motors.

Sometimes one or two armrests may also be attached to each individual seat, a feature commonly found in minivans (MPVs) and some SUVs.

Frequently there is a further armrest built into the door of the car, often forming part of the door pulling handle.

Rear
A rear armrest will typically fold away between the back seats, to allow for the central (third) seating place to be used. In some designs where occupant safety is emphasized, including some Volvo models, the armrest doubles as a child seat, complete with specially adjustable seatbelt. As with the front, it is not unusual to have armrests built into rear doors, or the side of the car if there is no rear door.

See also
 Footstool
 Head restraint
 Human factors and ergonomics
 Lyre arm

References

Automotive accessories
Automotive body parts
Chairs
Ergonomics